The  Kansas City Chiefs season was the franchise's 16th season in the National Football League and the 26th overall.

The Chiefs got off to a great start in 1985 with a 47–27 win at New Orleans, while safety Deron Cherry tied an NFL record by registering four interceptions in a 28–7 win against Seattle on September 29 as the club boasted a 3–1 record four games into the season. The club was then confronted with a seven-game losing streak (amidst, nonetheless, the neighboring Kansas City Royals's World Series run) that wasn’t snapped until quarterback Todd Blackledge was installed as the starter against Indianapolis on November 24. The team rebounded to win three of its final five contests of the year with Blackledge under center, further inflaming a quarterback controversy that continued into the 1986 season.

Among these wins was the first time since 1972 that the Chiefs played the Atlanta Falcons, and merely the second in team history. The reason for this is that before the admission of the Texans in 2002, NFL scheduling formulas for games outside a team's division were much more influenced by table position during the previous season.

One of the few remaining bright spots in a disappointing 6–10 season came in the regular season finale against San Diego when wide receiver Stephone Paige set an NFL record with 309 receiving yards in a 38–34 win, breaking the previous mark of 303 yards set by Cleveland's Jim Benton in 1945. Paige's mark was subsequently surpassed by a 336-yard effort by Flipper Anderson (Los Angeles Rams) in 1989.

NFL Draft

Personnel

Staff

Roster

Schedule

Preseason

Regular season 

Note: Intra-division opponents are in bold text.

Game summaries

Week 1: at New Orleans Saints

Week 2: vs. Los Angeles Raiders

Week 3: at Miami Dolphins

Week 4: vs. Seattle Seahawks

Week 5: at Los Angeles Raiders

Week 6: at San Diego Chargers

Week 7: vs. Los Angeles Rams

Week 8: vs. Denver Broncos

Week 9: at Houston Oilers

Week 10: vs. Pittsburgh Steelers

Week 11: at San Francisco 49ers

Week 12: vs. Indianapolis Colts

Week 13: at Seattle Seahawks

Week 14: vs. Atlanta Falcons

Week 15: at Denver Broncos

Week 16: vs. San Diego Chargers

Standings

References

External links 
 1985 Kansas City Chiefs at Pro-Football-Reference.com

Kansas City Chiefs
Kansas City Chiefs seasons
Kansas